MBC Voice Acting Division is a South Korean voice acting company known for its work on movies, anime, documentaries, among other media. It is headquartered in Seoul, the capital of South Korea.

It is a part of the Munhwa Broadcasting Corporation, a South Korean public broadcaster.

References

External links
 

Munhwa Broadcasting Corporation subsidiaries
Mass media in Seoul